The Women's Freedom League was an organisation in the United Kingdom which campaigned for women's suffrage and sexual equality. It was an offshoot of the militant suffragettes after the Pankhursts decide to rule without democratic support from their members.

History
The group was founded in 1907 by seventy-seven members of the Women's Social and Political Union (WSPU) including Teresa Billington-Greig, Charlotte Despard, Alice Schofield, Edith How-Martyn and Margaret Nevinson. They disagreed with Christabel Pankhurst's announcement that the WSPU's annual conference was cancelled and that future decisions would be taken by a committee which she would appoint.

The League opposed violence in favour of non-violent forms of protest such as the non-payment of taxes, refusing to complete census forms and organising demonstrations, including members chaining themselves to objects in the Houses of Parliament. It grew to over 4,000 members and published The Vote newspaper weekly from 1909–1933. Sarah Benett was the League's Treasurer until her resignation in 1910. Dr Elizabeth Knight was a source of funds for the Women's Freedom League. She took over as Treasurer from Constance Tite in 1912 where she improved the WFL's financial situation. Before she was appointed, the league had had serious financial problems and on occasions had had to appeal to its members for loans. Knight introduced new fund raising schemes for the league although finances were improved by large donations by an "anonymous" person. It is suspected that this person was Knight. 

In 1912, Nina Boyle became head of the WFL's political and militant department. She published many articles in the WFL's newspaper, The Vote. Boyle started a campaign for women to become Special Constables. This campaign coincided with the outbreak of the First World War in 1914 and the call for volunteers for the war effort which Boyle wished to see taken up by women as well as men. When the request was officially refused, Boyle, together with Margaret Damer Dawson, a wealthy philanthropist and herself a campaigner for women's rights, established the first voluntary women's police force-the Women Police Volunteers (WPV).

The League continued their pacifism during the First World War, supporting the Women's Peace Council. On the outbreak of war, they had suspended their campaigns and undertook voluntary work.

In the 1918 general election, Despard, How-Martyn and Emily Frost Phipps stood unsuccessfully in London constituencies as independent women's rights anti-war candidates. They celebrated the achievement of suffrage and refocussed the WFL's activities on equality, including equal pay and equality of morality. The group declined in membership, but continued under the leadership of Marian Reeves to organise annual birthday parties for Despard, and maintain the Minerva Club in Brunswick Square. After Reeves' died in 1961, the organisation voted to dissolve itself.

The Vote and growth in the Women's Freedom League 
After the creation of the Women's Freedom League in 1907, it grew rapidly throughout Great Britain. The executive committee included Amy Sanderson, Scottish suffragette. The league consisted of sixty branches and had nearly four thousand members. The league established its own newspaper called The Vote. Members of the League who were writers led to the production of the newspaper. The Vote became the primary means of communication with the public, informing readers of campaigns, protests, and events. The newspaper helped to spread ideas concerning the First World War, allowing for the Women's Freedom League to advocate against the war. Members of the League refused to become involved in campaigning efforts led by the British Army. Members were upset when their women’s suffrage campaign came to a halt while the war was in progress.

Protests and events 
The League's main objective was to criticise, oppose and reform the government. The League held protests that advocated pacifism during the First World War. Not only did the League oppose the war, but they also used peaceful forms of protest only such as refusing to complete census forms and not paying taxes. For example, in 1908 and 1909 the members chained themselves to various objects in Parliament in order to protest against the Government. On 28 October 1908, three members of the Women's Freedom League, Muriel Matters, Violet Tillard, and Helen Fox, released a banner at the House of Commons. The women also chained themselves to the grille above a window. Law enforcement had to remove the grille while they were still attached until they could file off the locks that held them connected to the window. This protest became known as the Grille Incident.

Two members of the League, Alice Chapin and Alison Neilans, attacked polling stations during the 1909 Bermondsey by-election, smashing bottles containing corrosive liquid over ballot boxes in an attempt to destroy votes. A presiding officer, George Thornley, was blinded in one eye in one of these attacks, and a Liberal agent suffered a severe burn to the neck. The count was delayed while ballot papers were carefully examined, 83 ballot papers were damaged but legible but two ballot papers became undecipherable. Later they were sentenced to three months each in Holloway Prison.

Suffragette sisters Muriel and Arabella Scott chained themselves to their seats at a political event and spoke out on behalf of WFL and WSPU policies, at by-election hustings across Scotland.

The "Brown Women" were named after the brown coats that the walkers wore. Agnes Brown (coincidentally), Isabel Cowe and four others set off from Edinburgh to walk to London. They had white scarfs and green hats and as they travelled they gathered signatures for a petition for women's rights. The hikers had to walk fifteen miles and attend a meeting each day and in this way they took five weeks to get to London.

Archives
The archives of the Women's Freedom League are held in The Women's Library at the Library of the London School of Economics.

See also
 Minerva Café, opened by the Women's Freedom league in 1916
 Women's suffrage in the United Kingdom
 List of suffragists and suffragettes
 Timeline of women's suffrage
 Women's suffrage organisations
 History of feminism

References

External links
Google News archive of The Vote
The Women's Library, which holds extensive suffrage collections
Spartacus on the Women's Freedom League

 
Feminist organisations in the United Kingdom
1907 establishments in the United Kingdom
1961 disestablishments in the United Kingdom
20th century in the United Kingdom
Organizations established in 1907
Organizations disestablished in 1961
Suffrage organisations in the United Kingdom